Raia or RAIA may refer to:

 A raia or la raia, alternative names for the Portugal–Spain border in other languages
 Raia, alternative spelling of Raja, a genus of rays in the family Rajidae
 Raia, alternative spelling of Raya (country subdivision), a subdivision in some parts of the Ottoman Empire
 Raia, Goa, a small village in Goa, India
 Kamen Rider Raia, a character from Kamen Rider Ryuki
 Royal Australian Institute of Architects (RAIA), a professional body for architects in Australia